Košarkaški klub Superfund BasketPlus, commonly referred to as Superfund BP, was a men's professional basketball club from Belgrade, Serbia. The club competed in the Basketball League of Serbia during the 2010–11 season.

Players

Coaches 

  Vuk Stanimirović 
  Srđan Flajs (2008–2010)
  Aleksandar Matović

Trophies and awards

Trophies
Second League of Serbia (2nd-tier)
Winner (1): 2009–10

References

External links
 KK Superfund at eurobasket.com
 KK Superfund at srbijasport.net

Superfund
Basketball teams established in 2002
Basketball teams disestablished in 2011
Basketball teams in Belgrade
New Belgrade